Baliset may refer to:

 Baliset (instrument), a fictional musical instrument in the Dune universe
 Baliset (band), an American band